The Netherlands competed at the 2018 Winter Olympics in Pyeongchang, South Korea, between 9 and 25 February 2018. Speed skater Jan Smeekens was appointed as flag bearer for the opening ceremony, which was attended by  King Willem Alexander, Queen Máxima and Prime Minister Mark Rutte, who also observed the sporting events that featured Dutch competitors.

The goal for the Dutch team was to win fifteen medals, as declared by Chef de mission Jeroen Bijl; they exceeded this goal by five medals, with a total of twenty, which placed the Netherlands fifth in the medal table. Most notably, the Dutch team dominated the individual speed skating events, winning seven of the ten gold medals awarded; they also won four medals in short track speed skating including their first ever gold medal in this discipline, won by Suzanne Schulting.

Highlights

Day 1
Netherlands made a podium sweep in the women's 3000 metres speed skating event – Carlijn Achtereekte won gold, Ireen Wüst won silver and Antoinette de Jong won bronze. Then a few minutes after the podium sweep, Sjinkie Knegt won the silver medal in the men's 1500 metres short track speed skating event.

Day 2
Sven Kramer won the gold medal in the men's 5000 metres speed skating event. Kramer became the first man ever to win a gold medal in the same speed skating event at three consecutive Winter Olympics.

Day 3
Netherlands took three of the top four places in the women's 1500 metres speed skating event; Ireen Wüst won the gold medal and Marrit Leenstra took bronze, only 0.01 seconds ahead of Lotte van Beek. On winning the gold medal, Wüst had succeeded in achieving gold medal wins at four consecutive Winter Olympics, exactly twelve years after winning her first gold medal in the 3000 metres in 2006. With a total of ten medals, including five golds, Wüst became the best ever Olympic speed skater (male or female) and the seventh-best Winter Olympic athlete overall.

Day 4
Olympic debutant Kjeld Nuis won the gold medal in the men's 1500 metres speed skating event. Patrick Roest, also an Olympic debutant, won the silver medal. Koen Verweij, one of the favorites for the win, disappointed with an eleventh place. In short track speed skating, Yara van Kerkhof unexpectedly won the silver medal in the women's 500 metres event, benefiting from the disqualification of the Korean Choi Min-jeong after initially finishing in third.

Medalists

| width="78%" align="left" valign="top" |

| width="22%" align="left" valign="top" |

Competitors
The following is the list of number of competitors participating at the Games per sport/discipline.

 Niek van der Velden was the only male snowboarder on the team, but did not compete due to a broken shoulder.
 Jorien ter Mors competed in both short track and long track speed skating (hence the totals appear to be one short).

Short track speed skating

According to the ISU Special Olympic Qualification Rankings, the Netherlands have qualified a full squad of five men and five women each.

 Dylan Hoogerwerf was also part of the relay team, but did not compete.

Women

 Rianne de Vries was also part of the relay team, but did not compete.

Key: AA = Advanced to medal round due to being impeded by another skater; DNF = Did not finish; FA = Qualified to medal round; FB = Qualified to consolation round; PEN = Penalty; Q = Qualified to next round; WR = World record

Skeleton 

Based on the world rankings, the Netherlands qualified two sleds. However, they elected to nominate only one athlete, Kimberley Bos, who was the first Dutch skeleton athlete ever to qualify for the Olympics. Although Bos met the international qualification criteria by virtue of her performance during the World Cup skeleton 2017–18, in which she finished in 13th place overall, she was not initially selected because she did not meet the NOC*NSF's own requirement (a top-12 place). However, NOC*NSF argued that Russian athlete Jelena Nikitina should be eliminated from the World Cup classification, as she had been excluded by the IOC from participating in the Olympics. When this was agreed, Bos rose to 12th place on the clean list for the World Cup classification, thereby fulfilling the NOC*NSF requirement, and her nomination was secured.

Snowboarding 

Niek van der Velden was unable to compete because of a broken shoulder caused by a crash in the final training for the slopestyle.

Cheryl Maas fell in both runs of the women's slopestyle, so she did not play an important role in the final. Strong winds during the final caused many of the athletes to fall; Maas called the conditions "irresponsible".
Freestyle

Parallel

Speed skating

The Dutch Olympic Committee selected the maximum allowed delegation of ten men and ten women, largely based on the results of the Olympic qualification tournament, held in December 2017. Kai Verbij was added for the 1000 metre event, because he was injured during the qualification race.

Men

Women

Mass start

Team pursuit

Key: FA = Qualified to gold medal round; FB = Qualified to bronze medal round; L = Lost; OR = Olympic record; Q = Qualified to next round; W = Won

References

Nations at the 2018 Winter Olympics
2018
Winter Olympics